The Ministry of Defence of Republic of Serbia is the ministry in the Government of Serbia which is in the charge of defending the Republic of Serbia from internal and external military threats. The current minister is Miloš Vučević, in office since 26 October 2022.

The Ministry uses Building "B" of the former Yugoslav Ministry of Defence building as its headquarters.

Organization
This is the organisation within the Ministry of Defence:

Minister of Defence
Cabinet of Minister
Section for protocol
State secretaries
Department for emergency situations
Department for budget and finances
Department for public relations
General Staff
Defence Policy Sector
Department for organization 
Department for strategic planning 
Department for international military cooperation
Institute for Strategic Research
Secretariat
Department for legal affairs 
Section for operational affairs 
Human Resources Sector
Department for personnel
Department for military obligations
Department for military education
Military Social Security Fund 
University of Defence
Material Resources Sector
Logistics Department
Military Geographic Institute "General Stevan Bošković"
Procurement Department
Defensive technologies Department 
Military Technical Institute
Technical Overhaul Institute "Đurđe Dimitrijević-Đura"
General Logistics Department
Military institution "Karađorđevo"
Military institution "Morović"
Military institution "Dedinje"
Military institution "Morava"
Military institution "Tara"
Military institution "Vrnjačka Banja"
Health Care Department
Military medical centre Belgrade
Military hospital Novi Sad
Military hospital Niš
Central pharmacy
Military medical commission
Infrastructure Department
Directorate for construction
Military construction institution "Beograd"
Military institution for the maintenance of buildings and dwellings "Beograd-2"
Directorate for urban construction-consulting
Military construction centre "Beograd"
Military construction centre "Niš"
Transport Section
Military Medical Academy
Military Intelligence Agency
Military Security Agency

List of ministers

Ministers of Army (1862–1918)
This is a list of all the Ministers of Army (and the Acting Ministers of Army) of the Principality of Serbia and the Kingdom of Serbia from the creation of the post in 1862 to the creation of Yugoslavia after World War I, in the late 1918. The list continues as a List of Defence Ministers of Yugoslavia.

Ministers of Defence (1991–1993; 2006–present)
This list includes Ministers of Defence from 1991 to 1993, and after the dissolution of the State Union of Serbia and Montenegro in 2006. For previous ministers, see Ministry of Defense (Yugoslavia).

Political Party:

|- style="text-align:center;"
| colspan=8| Part of Ministry of Defence of Yugoslavia

References

External links
 

Serbia
 
1991 establishments in Serbia
Ministries established in 1991